Mohammadabad (also Romanized as Moḩammadābād) is a village in Korond Rural District, in the Central District of Boshruyeh County, South Khorasan Province, Iran. At the 2006 census, its population was 26, in 7 families.

References 

Populated places in Boshruyeh County